The superior thalamic vein, initially called by Benno Shlesinger in 1976 the principal thalamic vein or centro-medial thalamic vein, also called by Russian surgeon Pirogoff internal thalamic vein is the most prominent vein of the thalamus. It shows great interindividual anatomic variations.

References  

Thalamic veins